The 2002 United States Special Senate election in Missouri was held on November 5, 2002 to decide who would serve the rest of Democrat Mel Carnahan's term, after he died while campaigning and posthumously won the 2000 election. The winner would serve four more years until the next election in 2006. Missouri Governor Roger Wilson appointed Carnahan's wife Jean, also a Democrat, to serve temporarily. She then decided to run to serve the remainder of the term, but she was narrowly defeated by Republican nominee Jim Talent.

Technically, the race flipped control of the Senate from Democrats to Republicans, but the Senate had adjourned before Talent could take office, and so no change in leadership occurred until the 108th Congress opened session on January 3, 2003. With a margin of 1.1%, this election was the second-closest race of the 2002 Senate election cycle, behind only the election in South Dakota.

Background
In the November 2000 elections, Democratic Governor of Missouri Mel Carnahan, who had died in a plane crash three weeks before, remained on the ballot for election to the U.S. Senate. Carnahan received more votes than his Republican opponent, incumbent Senator John Ashcroft, who did not legally contest being defeated by a dead candidate. Lieutenant Governor Roger B. Wilson ascended to serve the remaining three months of Carnahan's gubernatorial term, and promised to appoint Carnahan's widow in her husband's place should Carnahan posthumously defeat Ashcroft. Accordingly, Jean Carnahan was appointed to the Senate effective on January 3, 2001; and a special election was scheduled in 2002 for the balance of Carnahan's Senate term.

The Seventeenth Amendment requires that appointments to the Senate last only until a special election is held.

Democratic primary

Candidates
Jean Carnahan, incumbent U.S. Senator 
Darrel D. Day

Results

Republican primary

Candidates
Scott Craig Babbitt
Doris Bass Landfather, St. Louis alderman and perennial candidate
Martin Lindstedt, perennial candidate
Joseph A. May, dentist
Jim Talent, former U.S. Representative and nominee for Governor in 2000

Results

Libertarian primary

Candidates
Tamara A. Millay, perennial candidate
Edward Joseph Manley

Results

General election

Candidates
Jean Carnahan (D), incumbent U.S. Senator
Tamara Millay (L), perennial candidate
Daniel Romano (G)
Jim Talent (R), former U.S. Representative and nominee for governor in 2000

Campaign
National security and Carnahan's vote against fellow Missourian John Ashcroft as attorney general were major issues in the campaign. Republicans argued Carnahan owed her vote to Ashcroft, who had lost his bid for re-election to the Senate to Carnahan's husband. Talent, citing Carnahan's votes against homeland-security legislation and missile defense, accused her of being soft on national security, which she objected to, saying he was "doubt[ing] her patriotism."

Jack Abramoff contributed $2,000 to Talent's 2002 senatorial campaign and Preston Gates & Ellis, a former Abramoff employer, had also contributed $1,000 to Talent's campaign. Talent later returned both contributions. Talent's win returned Republican control of the Senate which had a small Democratic majority after Jim Jeffords left the Republican Party to become an Independent caucusing with Democrats.

Talent's victory wasn't certified until November 21, 2002, one day before Congress adjourned, which prevented them from claiming a senate majority. He automatically became a Senator the following day because, under federal law, he formally took office the day after both chambers of Congress adjourned. Because Republicans would hold the majority in the following congress, they saw no need to hold a special session in the 107th to take advantage of their brief majority.

Predictions

Polling

Results
Carnahan only won 26 counties and the independent city of St. Louis out of the state’s 114 counties. However, she kept the race close by running up margins in St. Louis and in Jackson County home of Kansas City, though her victory in St. Louis County was a close one.  Ultimately Talent was able to win the seat by running up decent margins in rural areas of the state.

See also 
 2002 United States Senate elections

Notes

References 

Missouri 2002
2002
Missouri
2002 Missouri elections
Missouri
United States Senate 2002